William Smith (September 20, 1751June 22, 1837) was a congressman, state senator and judge from South Carolina.

Smith was born in Bucks County in the Province of Pennsylvania, the oldest son of Ralph Smith and Mercy Penquite Smith. He moved to what became Spartanburg District, South Carolina with his family in 1765, where he became a planter. He fought in the Revolutionary War and served as a county judge from 1785 to 1797. He served in the South Carolina Senate from the Spartanburg District from 1790 to 1796 and was later elected a Democratic-Republican to the fifth congress serving from 1797 to 1799. He was elected back to the South Carolina Senate serving from 1810 to 1818.  He died in the Spartanburg District in 1837.

External links

References

1751 births
1837 deaths
Farmers from South Carolina
American planters
Burials in South Carolina
Continental Army soldiers
People from Bucks County, Pennsylvania
People from Spartanburg County, South Carolina
South Carolina state court judges
South Carolina state senators
Democratic-Republican Party members of the United States House of Representatives from South Carolina